Emmet Stagg (born 1 October 1944) is an Irish former Labour Party politician who served as Labour Party Chief Whip from 2007 to 2016, Minister of State at the Department of Transport, Energy and Communications from 1994 to 1997 and Minister of State at the Department of the Environment from 1993 to 1994. He served as a Teachta Dála (TD) from 1987 to 2016.

Early life
Stagg was born at Hollymount, County Mayo, and was one of thirteen siblings raised by parents, including his brother Frank Stagg. Stagg has described his childhood in Mayo as being gripped by poverty and by the rule of the Catholic Church. He educated at Ballinrobe CBS school and Kevin Street College of Technology. He worked as a medical technologist at Trinity College Dublin before entering full-time politics.

Political career
He was elected in 1979 to represent the Celbridge area on Kildare County Council for the Labour Party, serving until 1993. He was elected again in 1999, serving until 2003. Stagg was first elected to Dáil Éireann at the 1987 general election for the Kildare constituency. He then served as Labour front bench spokesperson on a number of areas, including Agriculture (1987–89) and Social Welfare (1989–92).

During the 1980s and early 1990s, Stagg was a prominent figure within the internal politics of the Labour Party, being viewed along with Michael D. Higgins and Joe Higgins as one of the leaders of the left-wing faction within the party opposed to coalition with Fine Gael, and as a prominent opponent of the then party leader Dick Spring. He opposed the expulsion of Joe Higgins and Militant Tendency at the 1989 conference, and in the early 1990s he considered leaving the party and joining the newly formed Democratic Left, though he ultimately chose to stay with the party. In the Fianna Fáil–Labour Party coalition government formed after the 1992 general election, he became Minister of State at the Department of the Environment, with special responsibility for Housing and Urban Renewal.

Stagg was appointed Minister of State at the Department of Transport, Energy and Communications in 1994, in the newly formed Rainbow Coalition Government.

He lost his seat at the 2016 general election, having served as a TD for 29 consecutive years.

He was the Labour Party candidate for Kildare North at the 2020 general election. At age 75, he was the oldest candidate in the entire general election, but was not elected.

Phoenix Park scandal
In 1994, while Minister of State, Stagg became the subject of a major press scandal after Gardaí had found him the previous November loitering in an area of Dublin's Phoenix Park used by male prostitutes. He was questioned by the Gardaí but no charges were filed against him. According to The Independent, public anger was largely focused on the member of the Gardaí who leaked details to the media despite no crime being committed.

Personal life

Emmet Stagg's brother Frank Stagg was a Provisional Irish Republican Army member, who died in a British prison in 1976 while on hunger strike. Emmett and his brothers quarrelled over whether Frank should be buried with his family, or in a dedicated "Republican" plot. The resulting dispute, into which the Irish government directly intervened, escalated into mayhem that resulted in the body of Frank Stagg being buried three separate times.

References

External links
Emmet Stagg's page on the Labour Party website

 

1944 births
Living people
Alumni of Dublin Institute of Technology
Labour Party (Ireland) TDs
Local councillors in County Kildare
Members of the 25th Dáil
Members of the 26th Dáil
Members of the 27th Dáil
Members of the 28th Dáil
Members of the 29th Dáil
Members of the 30th Dáil
Members of the 31st Dáil
Ministers of State of the 27th Dáil
Politicians from County Mayo